Bruce Allan Gardiner (born February 11, 1972) is a Canadian former professional ice hockey player.

Playing career
Gardiner was drafted 131st overall by the St. Louis Blues in the 1991 NHL Entry Draft and started his National Hockey League career with the Ottawa Senators in 1997. He also played for the Tampa Bay Lightning, Columbus Blue Jackets, and New Jersey Devils. He left the NHL after the 2002 season and moved to the Russian Super League with Lada Togliatti and then to Finland's SM-liiga with the Espoo Blues.  He then had one more year in North America, playing for the Adirondack Frostbite of the United Hockey League before retiring in 2005.

Gardiner scored the first goal in Columbus Blue Jackets' franchise history.

Regular season and playoffs

References

External links

1972 births
Adirondack Frostbite players
Albany River Rats players
Colgate Raiders men's ice hockey players
Columbus Blue Jackets players
Espoo Blues players
Canadian expatriate ice hockey players in Russia
HC Lada Togliatti players
Living people
New Jersey Devils players
Ottawa Senators players
Peoria Rivermen (IHL) players
Prince Edward Island Senators players
St. Louis Blues draft picks
Tampa Bay Lightning players
Ice hockey people from Simcoe County
Sportspeople from Barrie
Canadian ice hockey centres